In aviation, a traffic pattern indicator is a L-shaped device which show the airfield traffic pattern to the in-flight aircraft over an aerodrome. The short arm of the "L" represents the base leg, and the long arm the final approach.

References

Air traffic control